Vestmannaeyjar Airport  is a two-runway airport on the island of Heimaey, in Vestmannaeyjar (Westman Islands), a small archipelago off the south coast of Iceland. It is also known as Westman Islands Airport.

Operations
Air Iceland Connect flew multiple daily flights to Reykjavík Airport before it ended all scheduled activity on 3 August 2010. The main carrier is now Eagle Air.  

Vestmannaeyjar Airport previously had private flights to Bakki Airport on the southern coast of Iceland, taking approximately 7 minutes (depending on the weather); the scheduled flights to Reykjavík Airport takes 25 minutes.

History
During Eldfell's volcanic eruption in 1973, Vestmannaeyjar Airport served as an evacuation point for elderly and patients from the hospital who could not evacuate by boat. After the eruption was over, the tephra provided suitable materials to extend the runways.

Airlines and destinations

Statistics

Passengers and movements

Notes

References

External links 

 

Airports in Iceland
Airport